Gurdaspur railway station is a main railway station in Gurdaspur district, Punjab. Its code is GSP. It serves Gurdaspur city. The station consists of two platforms. The platforms are not well sheltered. It lacks many facilities including water and sanitation.

The station is connected with the nearest station Pathankot and Amritsar and there are many trains to Pathankot and Amritsar.

Major trains 
 Jammu Tawi–Bathinda Express
 Pathankot–Amritsar DMU
 Pathankot Jn–Amritsar Passenger
 Durg–Jammu Tawi Express (via Amritsar)
 Delhi–Pathankot Superfast Express
 Muri Express
 Sambalpur–Jammu Tawi Express
 Ravi Express

References

Railway junction stations in India
Railway stations in Gurdaspur district
Firozpur railway division